Lucky Star 2015 is a 2015 comedy film directed by Ching Long. The film is a co-production between Hong Kong, China and Taiwan. It was released in China on March 1, 2015, and will be released in Hong Kong on March 5, 2015.

Cast
Eric Tsang
Wong Cho-lam
Ella Chen
Dada Chan
Wen Chao 
Kingdom Yuen
Yuen Qiu
Jessica Jann
Gabriel Wong
Wong Yat-fei
Tin Kai-man
Lollipop F
Cheng Man-fai
Fung Min-hun
Tats Lau
Louis Yuen
Si Ming
Koo Ming-wah
Stephen Au
Fun Lo
Yu Mo-lin
Wen Xiang
Edward Chui
Cliff Chan

Reception
By March 1, the film had earned  at the Chinese box office.

References

External links

2015 comedy films
Chinese comedy films
Hong Kong comedy films
Taiwanese comedy films
2010s Hong Kong films